Alan Louis Cassell (16 February 1932 – 30 August 2017) was an English Australian actor, on stage, film and television.

Personal life
Alan Cassell was born in Manchester, England but grew up in Birmingham. Cassell was of a young age when his mother was admitted to the Rubery Lunatic Asylum after she suffered brain damage following a visit to a dentist. It is believed the dentist had left the gas on for too long which caused the brain damage.

Cassell worked as a motor trimmer in an Austin Motor Company car factory in Birmingham during the 1950s. He also performed national service, although a senior officer convinced him not to volunteer for service in the Korean War.

After meeting a woman called Rosina, they married and in 1957 emigrated to Perth in Western Australia as "Ten Pound Poms", where he continued his work as a motor trimmer before moving to the sales department.

From 1983, Cassell lived in Victoria.

He was a prominent member of the Save Albert Park movement, after it was first proposed the Australian Grand Prix would relocate to the area where Cassell would walk his dogs.

In his later years, Cassell was diagnosed with dementia and lived in an aged care facility at Kyneton where he died on 30 August 2017 at the age of 85.

After Cassell's death, Australian film director Bruce Beresford placed an obituary in The Age and The Sydney Morning Herald in which he described Cassell as "one of the most gifted actors I have had the privilege to work with - and one of the most charming."

Career
He commenced his acting career in Western Australia when he and his friend signed up for acting classes hosted by the Patch Theatre Company, which began his career as a stage actor.  His first role was a doctor who said two words, but he was soon playing the lead in subsequent productions.

Cassell became heavily involved with promoting theatre in Perth and established his own theatre called "Hole in the Wall". When Edgar Metcalfe was brought out to Australia to run The Playhouse Theatre, he began casting Cassell and the two became good friends.

He won "Best Actor of the Year" for his role in A Day in the Death of Joe Egg.  He later worked for the Sydney Theatre Company and the Melbourne Theatre Company.  He was in the original cast of Away, which toured to New York. 

Cassell also played Boss Finley in Sweet Bird of Youth with Lauren Bacall for the Sydney Theatre Company, accepting the role after the actor originally cast in it, Frank Wilson, suffered a heart attack.

Cassell was one of the actors who worked in Beresford's early Australian films after moving to the eastern states to audition for Beresford and Hector Crawford.

His film credits included: Money Movers, Cathy's Child (for which he was nominated for Best Actor at the 1979 Australian Film Institute Awards), Squizzy Taylor, Breaker Morant, Puberty Blues, The Club, The Honourable Wally Norman and Strange Bedfellows.

Cassell's television roles included: The Drifter, Falcon Island, Taurus Rising, Special Squad, The Flying Doctors, The Power, The Passion, Blue Heelers, SeaChange, Stingers and MDA.

Cassell was recognised at the 1979 Sammy Awards for his role in Cathy's Child.

Filmography

References

External links
 

1932 births
2017 deaths
Australian male film actors
Australian male television actors
Australian male stage actors
English emigrants to Australia
Male actors from Manchester